Jerzy Antoni Krupka is a Polish scientist who works at both Warsaw University of Technology and University of Western Australia. The main areas of his research are related to measurements of electromagnetic properties of materials at microwave frequencies and computational electrodynamic. Measurement instruments intended for measurements of the complex permittivity, the complex permeability and conductivity of electronic materials at microwave frequencies developed by Jerzy Krupka are used worldwide in research institutions and industry. 
In 2012 he was elevated to the grade of IEEE Fellow for contributions to high-frequency measurements of electromagnetic properties of materials. His works were cited over 5000 times and brought him an h-index of 34.

References

External links

Living people
20th-century births
Polish computer scientists
Academic staff of the Warsaw University of Technology
Academic staff of the University of Western Australia
Year of birth missing (living people)
Fellow Members of the IEEE